Mehdi Bushati (born 20 February 1939) is an Albanian footballer. He played in six matches for the Albania national football team from 1963 to 1965.

References

1939 births
Living people
Albanian footballers
Albania international footballers
Place of birth missing (living people)
Association football midfielders
FK Dinamo Tirana players